The 2015–16 Tunisian Cup (Coupe de Tunisie) was the 84th season of the football cup competition of Tunisia.
The competition is organized by the Fédération Tunisienne de Football (FTF) and open to all clubs in Tunisia.
Ligue 1 teams entered the competition in the Round of 32.

First round

Ligue 2 games
Only Ligue 2 teams compete in this round.

Second round
Only Ligue 2 and Ligue 3 teams compete in this round.

*The game didn't take place because it was supposed to be played behind closed doors but BS Bannène fans did assist, which led the referee to decide not to start the match. The FTF awarded the victory to CS Chebba.

Round of 32
The draw also determined the games of the Round of 16 and those of the quarter-finals.

ES Métlaoui got a bye and qualified to the Round of 16.

Round of 16

Quarter-finals
The games were played on 16 August 2016.

Semi-finals
The games were played on 20 August.

Final

See also
2015–16 Tunisian Ligue Professionnelle 1
2015–16 Tunisian Ligue Professionnelle 2
2015–16 Tunisian Ligue Professionnelle 3

References

External links
 Coupe de Tunisie 2015-16

Tunisian Cup